The Covelli Center is a multi-purpose arena located on the campus of Ohio State University in Columbus, Ohio. The 3,700-seat facility is situated at 2640 Fred Taylor Drive, the area provides a home to seven varsity sports teams. The building is attached the Jennings Wrestling Practice Facility.

About 
The  facility was opened on June 4, 2019, and serves as the home to the fencing, men's and women's gymnastics, men's and women's volleyball, and wrestling programs. The site also occasionally serves as a venue for the women's basketball team. This state-of-the-art arena is able to be configured to accommodate several athletic events and includes 10 locker rooms, seven coach's offices as well as athletic training and meeting spaces.

Construction of the arena began in September 2017 and was originally slated to open in 2018, but was delayed until June 2019. 

According to Ohio State, the facility hosted 158 student-athletes, 58 competitions and around 1,500 youth campers in its first year.

Plans 
The building was originally intended to replace the aging St. John Arena, which was built in 1956.  After a public outcry, university officials changed the plan and built it in its current location. However, with the new location, 50 graduate-student apartments were torn down in Buckeye Village. Additionally, it raised the cost from an estimated $30 million to nearly $50 million.

Naming 
The facility was named after Sam Covelli after he and his wife Caryn donated $10 million towards the project. Covelli is the founder and president of Covelli Enterprises, which is the largest Panera Bread franchisee. The remaining costs for the project were raised through private donors.

Tenants 
 Women's basketball – Hosting select games at the Covelli Center
 Fencing
 Men's and women's volleyball – Practice and match facility for both teams
 Men's and women's gymnastics – Meet facility
 Wrestling – Meet facility

References

External links

 http://www.vindy.com/news/2012/nov/25/covelli-enters-osu-donation-record-book/?newswatch
 http://www.ohiostatebuckeyes.com/genrel/112112aaa.html

Ohio State University
College gymnastics venues in the United States
College volleyball venues in the United States
College wrestling venues in the United States
Basketball venues in Columbus, Ohio
Ohio State Buckeyes basketball venues
Ohio State Buckeyes men's gymnastics venues
Ohio State Buckeyes women's gymnastics venues
Ohio State Buckeyes men's volleyball venues
Ohio State Buckeyes women's volleyball venues
Ohio State Buckeyes wrestling venues
Sports venues in Columbus, Ohio
Indoor arenas in Columbus, Ohio
University District (Columbus, Ohio)